Ricardo da Silva (born 29 October 1983) is a Portuguese-born Australian footballer. He currently plays as an attacking midfielder for National Premier Leagues South Australia club West Adelaide.

Club career
In 2005, Da Silva signed with Portuguese football club S.C.U. Torreense. He remained at the club until 2007, when he decided to move back to Australia due to family reasons. Since returning to Adelaide he played for a number of South Australian Super League clubs including Adelaide Galaxy, Adelaide Blue Eagles and Adelaide City where he scored 23 goals over three seasons.

Adelaide United
On 22 September 2011, it was officially announced that Adelaide United had signed Da Silva on a one-year contract.
On 19 November 2011, Ricardo Da Silva made his debut for Adelaide United against Wellington Phoenix in Auckland. The game ended in a 1–1 draw.

Personal
Da Silva moved to Adelaide, Australia, in 2003, and studied as an international high school student for two years.

References

Living people
1983 births
A-League Men players
Adelaide City FC players
Adelaide Olympic FC players
Adelaide United FC players
Association football midfielders
Australian soccer players
FFSA Super League players
National Premier Leagues players
People from Torres Vedras
Portuguese emigrants to Australia
Portuguese footballers
S.C.U. Torreense players
West Adelaide SC players
West Torrens Birkalla SC players
FK Beograd (Australia) players
Sportspeople from Lisbon District
FK Beograd (Australia) non-playing staff